The GE U50 was an eight-axle,  diesel-electric locomotive built by GE Rail.  They were twin-engined locomotives, combining two  diesel engines.

Configuration

The U50 rode on four two-axle trucks, grouped in pairs linked by span bolsters, giving a wheel arrangement of B+B-B+B. The trucks and bolsters were re-used from scrapped UP turbine locomotives built by GE during the 1950s. The U50 is sometimes inaccurately referred to as the U50D, a back-formation from the U50C name given to the six-axle units. The name is incorrect and was never used by the manufacturer or the railroad. None of the U50s rode on D trucks in any case. It is also sometimes referred to as the U50B, but this is incorrect as well.

The U50 was built in response to the Union Pacific Railroad's requirement, issued in the early 1960s, for a  3-unit locomotive intended to replace the turbines.  The design was effectively two U25B locomotives on a single frame; each diesel engine and generator powered only the two trucks at the same end. Three were delivered to the UP in October 1963, and three to the Southern Pacific Railroad in May and June 1964.  Other locomotives built to this requirement were the EMD DD35A and the ALCO Century 855.

The Southern Pacific kept the three but did not order any more.  They were kept on the roster until the late 1970s, but were often sidelined. While the UP's units were nicknamed "U-Boats", The SP's units gained the nickname "Baby Hueys" from the cartoon character of the same name.  Original numbers were #8500-8502; they were later renumbered #9550-9552 and renumbered again to #9950-9952. Southern Pacific's three units differed from the Union Pacific U50s by having a cab door and headlights in the hood beneath the front windows.

The Union Pacific was more satisfied with their three, and ordered 20 more.  A batch of 12 were delivered between July and September 1964, while a final eight were built May through August 1965.  They were numbered #31-53. UP #52 was delivered with a Cummins PT fuel system and rated at 5,600 horsepower. The #52 had a standard fuel system installed in October 1966 and was rerated to 5,000 horsepower.

Twenty of the Union Pacific U50s were withdrawn from service in 1973 and 1974 and traded-in to GE for U30Cs. The last three Union Pacific units remained on the roster until April 1977. The Southern Pacific's three survived in service until 1977. All of the Union Pacific "U-Boats" & Southern Pacific "Baby Hueys" were sold for scrap by 1977.

See also
Union Pacific GTELs
EMD DD35A
ALCO Century 855

References 

 
 
 
  Mentions earlier UP GE purchases also.
 
 

Diesel-electric locomotives of the United States
U50
Union Pacific Railroad locomotives
B+B-B+B locomotives
Railway locomotives introduced in 1963
Scrapped locomotives
Freight locomotives
Standard gauge locomotives of the United States